Tömöriin Ariunaa (born 15 March 1967), known mononymously as Ariunaa, is a Mongolian pop singer. Often referred to as the "Madonna of Mongolia", she is compared to Russia's Alla Pugacheva, and popular with fans for her "singing style, provocative subject matter, and charisma"

Biography
Ariunaa was born in Ulaanbaatar, and began performing when she was 15. In 1986, she studied music in Bulgaria.

She released her first solo album, Eros, in 1996. Her most successful hits are "It my blue jeans…", "Sixteen year-old", "A Mongolian Steppe Family" and "Sacred fate".  In 2017, she released "Utasnii Chin Dugaar" as a part of COSMIC PROJECT It is rumored to have cost 100 million tugrik for the musical short film "Legendary Morning" (Домгийн өглөө) and over 200 people were involved in the production.

Aruinaa has toured in Yugoslavia, South Korea, Japan, and the United States.

Personal life 
Aruinaa's husband, G. Buyandorj, is president of Noyod Group. They have two children. In 2002, she was appointed as UN Ambassador for children. She also founded an organization to help children with disabilities.

Discography 
 Эрос No.1 (Eros 1) (1996)
Зөвхөн чиний тухай (Zȯvkhȯn chiniĭ tukhaĭ) (1999)
 Чи минь (Chi minʹ) (2001)
Хаврын шөнийн бодол (2002)
Миний шинэ орон зай (2003)
Дурлал шиг асна (2006)
"Be like Heaven" (2019)

References 

1967 births
Living people
20th-century Mongolian women singers
21st-century Mongolian women singers
People from Ulaanbaatar